The Commercial Cable Company Building was an early skyscraper at 22-24 Broad Street Extension in Manhattan, New York City. Built for the Commercial Cable Company, it started construction in 1896 and was completed in 1897. It was designed by Harding & Gooch. Its height was 92.7 m (304 ft) and it was 22 stories tall. The building, like many of its contemporaries, was built in a historicist style, richly decorated. Two domes were designed on top.

It stood for half a century and was demolished in 1954. A 27-story modern office building was built in its place.

References 

1897 establishments in New York City
1954 disestablishments in New York (state)
Buildings and structures completed in 1897
Buildings and structures demolished in 1954
Demolished buildings and structures in Manhattan
Financial District, Manhattan